Tannodia is a plant genus of the family Euphorbiaceae first described as a genus in 1861. It is native to Africa, Madagascar, and Comoros. It is dioecious.

Species
 Tannodia congolensis - Zaïre
 Tannodia cordifolia - Comoros, Madagascar
 Tannodia grandiflora - Diana Region in Madagascar
 Tannodia nitida - Atsinanana in Madagascar
 Tannodia obovata - Atsinanana in Madagascar
 Tannodia pennivenia - Atsinanana in Madagascar
 Tannodia perrieri - Madagascar
 Tannodia swynnertonii - Tanzania, Mozambique, Zimbabwe
 Tannodia tenuifolia - Kenya, Tanzania, Malawi, Mozambique, Zimbabwe, Zambia

References

Aleuritideae
Euphorbiaceae genera
Taxa named by Henri Ernest Baillon
Dioecious plants